The women's individual recurve archery competition at the 2010 Asian Games in Guangzhou was held from 19 November to 23 November at Aoti Archery Range.

Schedule
All times are China Standard Time (UTC+08:00)

Results

Qualification round

Knockout round

Bracket

Finals

Top half

Bottom half

1/16 eliminations

1/8 eliminations

1/4 eliminations

Semifinals

Bronze medal match

Gold medal match

References 
 2010 Asian Games Archery Results Book

External links 
 Official website

Women's individual